Ivory Coast competed at the 1976 Summer Olympics in Montreal, Quebec, Canada.  Ivory Coast and Senegal were the only two African nations that attended these Games.

Results by event

Athletics
Men's 4 × 100 m Relay
Kraarsene Konan, Georges Kablan Degnan, Gastom Kouadio, and Amadou Meïté
 Heat — 40.23s
 Semi Finals — 40.64s (→ did not advance)

Men's Long Jump
Kouakou Brou
 Qualification — 7.20m (→ did not advance)

References

External links
 

Nations at the 1976 Summer Olympics
1976
1976 in Ivory Coast